Move is the 17th studio album by Earl Klugh released in 1994.

Track listing 
All tracks composed by Earl Klugh
"Across the Sand" - 5:08
"Move" - 4:43
"Far from Home" - 5:29
"Tiptoe'in" - 5:11
"Nightwalk" - 6:18
"Face in the Wind" - 4:21
"Big Turtle River" - 4:14
"Highway Song" - 5:19
"Winter Rain" - 3:55
"Doin' It" - 5:05
"Across the Sand, Part II" - 2:10

Charts

References 

1994 albums
Earl Klugh albums
Warner Records albums